Rahil Gangjee (born 2 October 1978) is a professional golfer from India who currently plays on the Asian Tour, where he has two victories.

Early life and amateur career
Gangjee was born in Calcutta, but now resides in Bengaluru. He was educated at La Martiniere Calcutta. He had a decorated amateur career that included the 1997 Sri Lankan Amateur and the East India Amateur in 1997, 1998 and 2000. He would soon become India's number one amateur in 1999. 

He kept the title of being India's top ranked amateur by winning the Northern India Amateur in 2000. In the same year he won the Western India Amateur, by a margin of 19 strokes.

Professional career
Gangjee turned professional in 2001 by finishing as a runner up in the PGA of India Tour qualifying school. He won in his very first year as a professional in Lucknow. He played in his first full season on the Asian Tour in 2004. Just as he had won in his first year on the PGA of India Tour, he also won in his debut year on the Asia Tour.

Gangjee was a surprise winner in his lone tournament victory at the Volkswagen Masters-China in 2004. It was only his 4th start of the season and 8th career start on Tour. He finished at 15-under-par and won in a playoff over Mo Joong-kyung. The event featured many notable names including Ian Woosnam, Nick Faldo, Phillip Price, Jeev Milkha Singh, Des Terblanche and Zhang Lianwei.

Gangjee would continue playing full-time on the Asian Tour, not picking up  another tournament win between 2004 and 2008. He made 16 of 25 cuts with only one top-10 finish in 2008. He did however pick up a win in June 2008 at the PGTI Players Championship on the Professional Golf Tour of India in his hometown of Calcutta by a margin of five strokes.

At the end of 2010 Gangjee qualified for the Nationwide Tour. At the 2011 Mylan Classic, Gangjee made an ace on the par-4 15th hole during the final round. He used driver to pull off the 318 yard shot.

Gangjee played on the Nationwide Tour in 2011 and 2012 and then returned to the Asian Tour. His best finish on the Nationwide Tour was T-11 at the 2011 Rex Hospital Open.

Gangjee's next significant win came in April 2018 in Japan when he won the Panasonic Open Golf Championship. This secured his Japan Golf Tour card for the following 3 years. He also won the Louis Philippe Cup (an Asian Development Tour) event in the same year.

Personal life
Rahil Gangjee participated in most sports in this school life. He represented his school La Martiniere Calcutta in swimming from the early age of 6. He also excelled in elocution, won plenty of times for Martin House. He ended his school life playing Hockey for his school and was the fastest runner in the 100 meters and 200 meters in class 11 and 12. He was prefect for house Martin and even sang for the choir. Rahil was interested in horseback riding, but his father made him give it up because he believed it was too dangerous as it could be too detrimental for his potential career in golf .

Rahil is a member of Royal Calcutta Golf Club and Tollygunge Club, where he grew up and honed his golfing skills.

Gangjee credits Arjun Atwal (a former Asian Number One), as his inspiration. Atwal lived three doors down from Gangjee in Calcutta.

Amateur wins
1997 Sri Lankan Amateur, East India Amateur
1998 East India Amateur
2000 East India Amateur, Western India Amateur, Northern India Amateur

Professional wins (6)

Japan Golf Tour wins (1)

1Co-sanctioned by the Asian Tour

Asian Tour wins (2)

1Co-sanctioned by the Japan Golf Tour

Asian Tour playoff record (1–1)

Asian Development Tour wins (1)

1Co-sanctioned by the Professional Golf Tour of India

Professional Golf Tour of India wins (3)

1Co-sanctioned by the Asian Development Tour

Other wins (1)
2001 HT Pro Golf Lucknow

Playoff record
Challenge Tour playoff record (0–1)

Team appearances
Amateur
Eisenhower Trophy (representing India): 2000

References

External links

Indian male golfers
Asian Tour golfers
PGA Tour golfers
Golfers from West Bengal
Sportspeople from Kolkata
1978 births
Living people